The Wyandotte Alkalis were a minor league baseball team based in Wyandotte, Michigan. In 1912 and 1913, the Alkalis, named for a locally based company, played exclusively as members of the Class D level Border League, winning the 1912 league championship. Wyandotte hosted home minor league games at Alkali Park.

History
In 1912, the Wyandotte, Michigan based Wyandotte Alkalis became charter members of the five–team Class D level Border League. The Border League featured teams from both the United States and Canada. The 1912 league featured the Mount Clemens Bathers, Pontiac Indians, Port Huron Independents and Windsor teams joining the Wyandotte Alkalis in Border League play.

The "Alkalis" moniker derives from local business and the Michigan Alkali Company. The company headquarters was located along Biddle Street in Wyandotte. The Michigan Alkali Company owned much of the property in Wyandotte, Michigan during the era, including Alkali Park, the Wyandotte Alkalis' home ballpark.

In their first season of play, the 1912 Wyandotte Alkalis won the Border League Championship. Beginning league play on May 30, 1912, Wyandotte had a final record 19–5 to win the title under manager H.R. Browne. Wyandotte finished 4.5 games ahead of the 2nd place Pontiac Indians (14–9), followed by the Mount Clemens Bathers (11–15), Windsor (9–14) and Port Huron Independents (7–17) in the final standings.

The Wyandotte Alkalis played their final season in 1913. Beginning play on May 24, 1913, the Alkalis placed 2nd in the 1913 the Border League standings. Wyandotte ended the 1913 season with a 24–13 record, as manager H.R. Browne returned. The Alkalis finished 1.5 games behind the 1st place Ypsilanti, Michigan team in the six–team league final standings.

The Border League folded after the 1913 season. Wyandotte, Michigan has not hosted another minor league team.

The ballpark
The Wyandotte Alkalis played 1912 and 1913 home minor league games at Alkali Park. The ballpark was reported to have opened on May 16, 1901, built by the Michigan Alkali Company, namesake of the team. The ballpark site today is home to the 9–hole Wyandotte Shores Golf Course, located at 3625 Biddle Avenue Wyandotte, Michigan.

Timeline

Year–by–year record

Notable alumni
No alumni of the Wyandotte Alkalis reached the major leagues.

References

External links
 Baseball Reference

Defunct minor league baseball teams
Defunct baseball teams in Michigan
Baseball teams established in 1912
Baseball teams disestablished in 1913
Border League teams
Wyandotte, Michigan